Pathophysiology ( physiopathology) – a convergence of pathology with physiology – is the study of the disordered physiological processes that cause, result from, or are otherwise associated with a disease or injury. Pathology is the medical discipline that describes conditions typically observed during a disease state, whereas physiology is the biological discipline that describes processes or mechanisms operating within an organism. Pathology describes the abnormal or undesired condition, whereas pathophysiology seeks to explain the functional changes that are occurring within an individual due to a disease or pathologic state.

History

Etymology
The term pathophysiology comes from the Ancient Greek πάθος (pathos) and φυσιολογία (phisiologia).

Nineteenth century

Reductionism

In Germany in the 1830s, Johannes Müller led the establishment of physiology research autonomous from medical research.  In 1843, the Berlin Physical Society was founded in part to purge biology and medicine of vitalism, and in 1847 Hermann von Helmholtz, who joined the Society in 1845, published the paper "On the conservation of energy", highly influential to reduce physiology's research foundation to physical sciences.  In the late 1850s, German anatomical pathologist Rudolf Virchow, a former student of Müller, directed focus to the cell, establishing cytology as the focus of physiological research, while Julius Cohnheim pioneered experimental pathology in medical schools' scientific laboratories.

Germ theory
By 1863, motivated by Louis Pasteur's report on fermentation to butyric acid, fellow Frenchman Casimir Davaine identified a microorganism as the crucial causal agent of the cattle disease anthrax, but its routinely vanishing from blood left other scientists inferring it a mere byproduct of putrefaction.  In 1876, upon Ferdinand Cohn's report of a tiny spore stage of a bacterial species, the fellow German Robert Koch isolated Davaine's bacterides in pure culture —a pivotal step that would establish bacteriology as a distinct discipline— identified a spore stage, applied Jakob Henle's postulates, and confirmed Davaine's conclusion, a major feat for experimental pathology.  Pasteur and colleagues followed up with ecological investigations confirming its role in the natural environment via spores in soil.

Also, as to sepsis, Davaine had injected rabbits with a highly diluted, tiny amount of putrid blood, duplicated disease, and used the term ferment of putrefaction, but it was unclear whether this referred as did Pasteur's term ferment to a microorganism or, as it did for many others, to a chemical.  In 1878, Koch published Aetiology of Traumatic Infective Diseases, unlike any previous work, where in 80 pages Koch, as noted by an historian, "was able to show, in a manner practically conclusive, that a number of diseases, differing clinically, anatomically, and in aetiology, can be produced experimentally by the injection of putrid materials into animals."  Koch used bacteriology and the new staining methods with aniline dyes to identify particular microorganisms for each. Germ theory of disease crystallized the concept of cause—presumably identifiable by scientific investigation.

Scientific medicine

The American physician William Welch trained in German pathology from 1876 to 1878, including under Cohnheim, and opened America's first scientific laboratory —a pathology laboratory— at Bellevue Hospital in New York City in 1878.  Welch's course drew enrollment from students at other medical schools, which responded by opening their own pathology laboratories.  Once appointed by Daniel Coit Gilman, upon advice by John Shaw Billings, as founding dean of the medical school of the newly forming Johns Hopkins University that Gilman, as its first president, was planning, Welch traveled again to Germany for training in Koch's bacteriology in 1883.  Welch returned to America but moved to Baltimore, eager to overhaul American medicine, while blending Vichow's anatomical pathology, Cohnheim's experimental pathology, and Koch's bacteriology.  Hopkins medical school, led by the "Four Horsemen" —Welch, William Osler, Howard Kelly, and William Halsted— opened at last in 1893 as America's first medical school devoted to teaching German scientific medicine, so called.

Twentieth century

Biomedicine

The first biomedical institutes, Pasteur Institute and Berlin Institute for Infectious Diseases, whose first directors were Pasteur and Koch, were founded in 1888 and 1891, respectively.  America's first biomedical institute, The Rockefeller Institute for Medical Research, was founded in 1901 with Welch, nicknamed "dean of American medicine", as its scientific director, who appointed his former Hopkins student Simon Flexner as director of pathology and bacteriology laboratories.  By way of World War I and World War II, Rockefeller Institute became the globe's leader in biomedical research.

Molecular paradigm

The 1918 pandemic triggered frenzied search for its cause, although most deaths were via lobar pneumonia, already attributed to pneumococcal invasion.  In London, pathologist with the Ministry of Health, Fred Griffith in 1928 reported pneumococcal transformation from virulent to avirulent and between antigenic types —nearly a switch in species— challenging pneumonia's specific causation. The laboratory of Rockefeller Institute's Oswald Avery, America's leading pneumococcal expert, was so troubled by the report that they refused to attempt repetition.

When Avery was away on summer vacation, Martin Dawson, British-Canadian, convinced that anything from England must be correct, repeated Griffith's results, then achieved transformation in vitro, too, opening it to precise investigation. Having returned, Avery kept a photo of Griffith on his desk while his researchers followed the trail.  In 1944, Avery, Colin MacLeod, and Maclyn McCarty reported the transformation factor as DNA, widely doubted amid estimations that something must act with it.  At the time of Griffith's report, it was unrecognized that bacteria even had genes.

The first genetics, Mendelian genetics, began at 1900, yet inheritance of Mendelian traits was localized to chromosomes by 1903, thus chromosomal genetics. Biochemistry emerged in the same decade. In the 1940s, most scientists viewed the cell as a "sack of chemicals" —a membrane containing only loose molecules in chaotic motion— and the only especial cell structures as chromosomes, which bacteria lack as such.  Chromosomal DNA was presumed too simple, so genes were sought in chromosomal proteins.  Yet in 1953, American biologist James Watson, British physicist Francis Crick, and British chemist Rosalind Franklin inferred DNA's molecular structure —a double helix— and conjectured it to spell a code.  In the early 1960s, Crick helped crack a genetic code in DNA, thus establishing molecular genetics.

In the late 1930s, Rockefeller Foundation had spearheaded and funded the molecular biology research program —seeking fundamental explanation of organisms and life— led largely by physicist Max Delbrück at Caltech and Vanderbilt University.  Yet the reality of organelles in cells was controversial amid unclear visualization with conventional light microscopy.  Around 1940, largely via cancer research at Rockefeller Institute, cell biology emerged as a new discipline filling the vast gap between cytology and biochemistry by applying new technology —ultracentrifuge and electron microscope— to identify and deconstruct cell structures, functions, and mechanisms.  The two new sciences interlaced, cell and molecular biology.

Mindful of Griffith and Avery, Joshua Lederberg confirmed bacterial conjugation —reported decades earlier but controversial— and was awarded the 1958 Nobel Prize in Physiology or Medicine.   At Cold Spring Harbor Laboratory in Long Island, New York, Delbrück and Salvador Luria led the Phage Group —hosting Watson— discovering details of cell physiology by tracking changes to bacteria upon infection with their viruses, the process transduction.  Lederberg led the opening of a genetics department at Stanford University's medical school, and facilitated greater communication between biologists and medical departments.

Disease mechanisms

In the 1950s, researches on rheumatic fever, a complication of streptococcal infections, revealed it was mediated by the host's own immune response, stirring investigation by pathologist Lewis Thomas that led to identification of enzymes released by the innate immune cells macrophages and that degrade host tissue.  In the late 1970s, as president of Memorial Sloan–Kettering Cancer Center, Thomas collaborated with Lederberg, soon to become president of Rockefeller University, to redirect the funding focus of the US National Institutes of Health toward basic research into the mechanisms operating during disease processes, which at the time medical scientists were all but wholly ignorant of, as biologists had scarcely taken interest in disease mechanisms.   Thomas became for American basic researchers a patron saint.

Examples
 The pathophysiology of Parkinson's disease is death of dopaminergic neurons as a result of changes in biological activity in the brain with respect to Parkinson's disease (PD). There are several proposed mechanisms for neuronal death in PD; however, not all of them are well understood. Five proposed major mechanisms for neuronal death in Parkinson's Disease include protein aggregation in Lewy bodies, disruption of autophagy, changes in cell metabolism or mitochondrial function, neuroinflammation, and blood–brain barrier (BBB) breakdown resulting in vascular leakiness.
 The pathophysiology of heart failure is a reduction in the efficiency of the heart muscle, through damage or overloading. As such, it can be caused by a wide number of conditions, including myocardial infarction (in which the heart muscle is starved of oxygen and dies), hypertension (which increases the force of contraction needed to pump blood) and amyloidosis (in which misfolded proteins are deposited in the heart muscle, causing it to stiffen). Over time these increases in workload will produce changes to the heart itself.
 The pathophysiology of multiple sclerosis is that of an inflammatory demyelinating disease of the CNS in which activated immune cells invade the central nervous system and cause inflammation, neurodegeneration and tissue damage. The underlying condition that produces this behaviour is currently unknown. Current research in neuropathology, neuroimmunology, neurobiology, and neuroimaging, together with clinical neurology provide support for the notion that MS is not a single disease but rather a spectrum
 The pathophysiology of hypertension is that of a chronic disease characterized by elevation of blood pressure. Hypertension can be classified by cause as either essential (also known as primary or idiopathic) or secondary. About 90–95% of hypertension is essential hypertension.
 The pathophysiology of HIV/AIDS involves, upon acquisition of the virus, that the virus replicates inside and kills T helper cells, which are required for almost all adaptive immune responses. There is an initial period of influenza-like illness, and then a latent, asymptomatic phase. When the CD4 lymphocyte count falls below 200 cells/ml of blood, the HIV host has progressed to AIDS, a condition characterized by deficiency in cell-mediated immunity and the resulting increased susceptibility to opportunistic infections and certain forms of cancer.
 The pathophysiology of spider bites is due to the effect of its venom. A spider envenomation occurs whenever a spider injects venom into the skin. Not all spider bites inject venom – a dry bite, and the amount of venom injected can vary based on the type of spider and the circumstances of the encounter. The mechanical injury from a spider bite is not a serious concern for humans.
 The pathophysiology of obesity involves many possible pathophysiological mechanisms involved in its development and maintenance. This field of research had been almost unapproached until the leptin gene was discovered in 1994 by J. M. Friedman's laboratory. These investigators postulated that leptin was a satiety factor. In the ob/ob mouse, mutations in the leptin gene resulted in the obese phenotype opening the possibility of leptin therapy for human obesity. However, soon thereafter J. F. Caro's laboratory could not detect any mutations in the leptin gene in humans with obesity. On the contrary Leptin expression was increased proposing the possibility of Leptin-resistance in human obesity.

See also
 Pathogenesis
 Pathology
 Physiology

References